The threespine grubfish (Simipercis trispinosa) is the only species in the monotypic genus Simipercis, part of the family Pinguipedidae. The species is endemic to waters off eastern Australia from Swain Reefs, Queensland, to Broken Bay, New South Wales. It is distinguished from other sandperch by having three spines in the dorsal fin.

References

Pinguipedidae
Marine fish of Eastern Australia
Monotypic fish genera
threespine grubfish